Bruce D Walker is an American physician and scientist.

An infectious disease specialist and researcher, Walker is the director of the Ragon Institute of MGH, MIT and Harvard.  The institute is a collaborative venture including Massachusetts General Hospital, Massachusetts Institute of Technology and Harvard University, with the initial goal of contributing to the development of an effective HIV vaccine. He is a Howard Hughes Medical Institute investigator, an adjunct faculty member at Nelson R. Mandela School of Medicine, and a founding scientist at the KwaZulu-Natal Research Institute for Tuberculosis and HIV (K-RITH).

Walker was named a Fellow of the American Association for the Advancement of Science (AAAS) in 2004. He was elected to the National Academy of Medicine in 2009.

References

Living people
American infectious disease physicians
Harvard Medical School faculty
Date of birth missing (living people)
Place of birth missing (living people)
Members of the National Academy of Medicine
Fellows of the American Association for the Advancement of Science
Howard Hughes Medical Investigators
Year of birth missing (living people)